Brachypalpus valgus is a species of hoverfly found in Europe.

Description
External images 
Brachypalpus are medium-sized (wing length 8.5-10.75 mm.) blackish flies with clouded wings. In Brachypalpus valgus the thorax and scutellum are unstriped and aeneous black. The abdominal tergites are shining black with red lateral colour at base of abdomen. Hairs on the body surface are sand brown. Hind trochanters with a posterior process. Hind tibiae slightly curved.
 The larva is illustrated by Rotheray (1993).

Mimicry
Superficially resembles a honey bee.

Distribution
Brachypalpus valgus is a Palearctic species with a limited distribution in Europe 
South Fennoscandia to the Pyrenees then Ireland east through central Europe and northern Italy to Yugoslavia and European parts of Russia.

Biology
Occurs in wooded areas (over-mature Fagus and Quercus forest with senile trees and fallen, rotting timber) where it is a bioindicator. The "short-tailed" larvae have been found in the rotten wood of trees, and under the bark. Males have a rapid, zigzag flight over the trunks of fallen tree. They fly with a high-pitched buzz. The female can be found investigating fallen trees. Both sexes visit the flowers of umbellifers, Berberis, Crataegus, Photinia, Prunus and Sorbus.

The flight period is from the end May to the end of June.

References

External links
 Biolib

Muscomorph flies of Europe
Eristalinae
Insects described in 1798
Taxa named by Georg Wolfgang Franz Panzer